Highway 30, also known as Port Alice Road, is a 30 km (19 mi) long northeast-to-southwest scenic route in the Regional District of Mount Waddington on Vancouver Island, connecting Port Alice with a location on Highway 19 known as Keogh, between Port Hardy and Port McNeill. Located halfway between the Junction with Highway 19 and Port Alice lies Marble River Provincial Park. As recently as 2008, the provincial government provided funds to have the entire highway resurfaced at a cost estimated around $1.3 million.

030
Transport on Vancouver Island